is a former Japanese football player.

Playing career
Toyoda was born in Oita Prefecture on May 2, 1976. After graduating from Komazawa University, he joined newly was promoted to J2 League club, Omiya Ardija in 1999. He debuted against Kawasaki Frontale on June 27. However he could hardly play in the match and retired end of 1999 season.

Club statistics

References

External links

1976 births
Living people
Komazawa University alumni
Association football people from Ōita Prefecture
Japanese footballers
J2 League players
Omiya Ardija players
Association football defenders